Siah Estalkh (also Romanized as Sīāh Esţalkh and Sīāh Asţalakh) is a village in Markiyeh Rural District, Mirza Kuchek Janghli District, Sowme'eh Sara County, Gilan Province, Iran. At the 2006 census, its population was 388, in 113 families.

References 

Populated places in Sowme'eh Sara County